Sobrante Ridge Regional Preserve (SRRP) is a regional park in Contra Costa County, California near Richmond and is part of the East Bay Regional Parks (EBRPD) system. The park may be best known as habitat for the Alameda manzanita, which is deemed extremely rare, according to EBRPD.

History
The land on which SRRP lies was once part of the Rancho El Sobrante grant that the government of Mexico gave to Juan Jose Castro. Although the cited source gives 1840 as the date of the grant, several other sources say that the grant was made in 1841. 

The site was owned in more recent times by Cutter Laboratories, a Berkeley-based pharmaceutical company. Cutter raised horses and cattle on the property, using blood from the animals to produce vaccines for diphtheria and tetanus. The German pharmaceutical company bought the entire Cutter company in 1974. Part of the Sobrante Ridge property was dedicated to EBRPD by a local construction company in 1980.

Features
Flora includes oak/bay woodland, coyote brush scrub, Alameda Manzanita and open grassland.

Activities
 Popular activities include: hiking, dog walking, picnicking, bird watching, bicycling (on approved trails) and naturalist programs.
 Picnic tables are available on a first-come, first-served basis and cannot be reserved. There are no reservable campsites.
 The preserve has three entrances: Coach Drive, Conestoga Drive and Heavenly Ridge Lane. 
 Trails are either dirt fire roads or single-track, multi-use trails that are not rated as wheel-chair accessible. EBRPD plans to install a wheelchair-accessible gate at the Heavenly Ridge Lane entrance in the future, but the schedule has not been announced.

Notes

References

See also
Alameda Manzanita
Rancho El Sobrante

External links
Sobrante Ridge Regional Preserve official web page
Sobrante Ridge Regional Preserve Official map.

East Bay Regional Park District
Parks in Contra Costa County, California